Signe Sommerfeldt Veiteberg (born 25 December 1999) is a Norwegian fashion model. After debuting as both a Prada exclusive and a Louis Vuitton exclusive in 2017, she has worked extensively with the latter fashion house.

Early life 
Veiteberg comes from the town of Drøbak in Frogn, Viken County, Norway and has a brother.

Career 

Veiteberg started her career by submitting photos to a local Norwegian modeling agency. She debuted as a Prada exclusive in 2017 for the S/S 2018 season. as well as a Louis Vuitton exclusive. Veiteberg has had an exclusive contract to work for the Louis Vuitton brand since the very beginning of her career. She appeared in a jewelry advertisement alongside Sophie Turner, Chloë Grace Moretz, Indya Moore, and Zhong Chuxi, as well as solo advertisements and opening its Resort 2020 fashion show and closing its shows. To date, the only other luxury brands besides Vuitton that Veiteberg has done an advertisement for are Ports 1961, Piaget, and Hermès. She has walked the runway for Balmain, Valentino, Givenchy, Hermès, Alexander McQueen, Alaïa, Isabel Marant, and Jean-Paul Gaultier.

In editorials, Veiteberg has appeared in WSJ, Harper's Bazaar, Vogue España, i-D, British Vogue, Vogue Italia, and on the cover of Vogue Japan and Harper's Bazaar España.

Veiteberg was nominated for "Breakout Star of the Year" by models.com, and appears on their list of "Top 50" models.

References 

Living people
Norwegian female models
People from Frogn
People from Viken (county)
Prada exclusive models
Louis Vuitton exclusive models
1999 births